Split the Atom is the debut studio album by Dutch drum and bass trio Noisia. The album was released on April 5, 2010 as a full-length CD as well as two double 12" EPs; the Vision EP includes four drum and Bass songs whilst the Division EP includes four electro house/breakbeat songs.

On February 27, 2012, Noisia released a special edition of Split The Atom on deadmau5's acclaimed label mau5trap. The first disc is the full-length original album while the second disc is a remix album with one original track, "Could This Be", that later become a single released through mau5trap.

Background
The singles from this album include "Machine Gun" (released March 8, 2010), which also includes remixes by Spor, Amon Tobin and 16bit, "Split the Atom" (released July 25, 2010), which has been remixed by Bar9 and Ed Rush & Optical, and "Alpha Centauri", which has been remixed by Excision & Datsik.

Some of the songs were previously released in various forms, "Stigma" was released in 2008 on Vision Recordings and "Diplodocus" was released in 2009 on Quarantine. Both "Stigma" and "Diplodocus" along with "Split the Atom", "Headknot" and "Square Feet" all feature on Noisia's FabricLive.40 released in June 2008. "Machine Gun" has also been released as part of WipEout HD Fury'''s soundtrack and appeared in a trailer for the video game Far Cry 3''.

Track listing

Original release
CD

Vinyl

Special edition

Critical reception
Split the Atom received critical acclaim from critics. Skiddle gave the album 4 out of 5 stars, saying "Split The Atom works to satisfy even the most fastidious of music fans."

Sputnik Music reviewer Deviant gave the album a 4.5 out of 5 stars, saying "Split The Atom is poised to destroy the lives of clubbers worldwide and invade the senses of anyone brave enough to invest ample time in it."

Personnel
Noisia
Martijn van Sonderen
Nik Roos
Thijs de Vlieger

Guests
Amon Tobin
Giovanca Ostiana
Joe Seven
Orifice Vulgatron (Foreign Beggars)
Metropolis (Foreign Beggars)
DJ Nonames (Foreign Beggars)
Dag Nabbit (Foreign Beggars)

Producers
Martijn van Sonderen
Nik Roos
Thijs de Vlieger

References

External links
Official site
Vision Recordings MySpace
Division Recordings MySpace

2010 debut albums
Noisia albums
Mau5trap albums